Boston Blackie's Rendezvous is a 1945 American crime film directed by Arthur Dreifuss. The working title of this film was Surprise in the Night.

Plot
Boston Blackie's life gets complicated when maniac murderer James Cook (Steve Cochran) goes on a killing spree, while pretending to be Boston Blackie.  To further complicate matters, the murderer kidnaps Sally Brown (Nina Foch) to keep Boston Blackie at bay.

Cast
 Chester Morris as Horatio 'Boston Blackie' Black
 Nina Foch as Sally Brown
 Steve Cochran as James Cook
 Richard Lane as Inspector John Farraday
 George E. Stone as The Runt
 Frank Sully as Detective Sergeant Matthews
 Iris Adrian as Martha
 Harry Hayden as Arthur Manleder (uncredited)

References

External links
 
 
 

Columbia Pictures films
American crime films
1945 crime films
1945 films
American black-and-white films
Boston Blackie films
Films directed by Arthur Dreifuss
1940s American films
1940s English-language films